In 1240, Batu Khan led a raid into Ruthenia as part of the Mongol invasion of Rus'. It took place three years after Batu's 1237 conquests of Volga Bulgaria and the Principality of Vladimir-Suzdal.

Events
According to the Hypatian Codex, at the end of 1238 Batu Khan retreated to the Cuman land (presumably the Donbas area), while sending his troops to Pereyaslav and Chernihiv. During the raid on Pereyaslav on March 3, 1239, the local church of St. Michael was destroyed and plundered, while its bishop, Simeon, was killed. None of the earlier period architecture survived. When Mstislav Glebovich heard that Batu Khan's troops besieged Chernihiv he attacked them near the city walls. Mstislav's army was destroyed, but he managed to flee. On October 18, 1239 Chernihiv was taken and burnt down. Chernihiv's Bishop Porfyriy was spared, but relocated to Hlukhiv.

While scouting in the vicinity of Kiev in the fall of 1239, Möngke Khan (Mengu Khan) reached Horodok Pisochny, located on the left bank of Dnieper across Kiev. Today it is part of Kiev city, in the Troieschyna neighborhood. Mengu-Khan sent his envoys to Michael and the city residents, but no one listened to them.  Soon after, Michael fled Kiev to Hungary and his throne in Kiev was temporarily taken over by Rostislav from Smolensk. However sometime during the winter Daniel of Galicia attacked Rostislav and replaced him with his voivode (tysyatsky) Dmytro. Also in Kamianets, Yaroslav of Medzhybozh took hostage the Grand Prince of Kiev's consort and sister of Daniel Olena Romanivna as well as several boyars of Michael. Daniel managed to convince Yaroslav to release his sister, who returned to live with Daniel and Vasylko.

In the summer of 1240, after unsuccessful negotiations with the King of Hungary (Béla IV) and the High Duke of Poland (Konrad I), Michael negotiated peace with Daniel and Vasylko who accepted his offer. Daniel promised to return Kiev to Michael, while giving his son Rostislav the city of Lutsk. However Michael refused to accept the princely seat in Kiev and until the fall of Kiev stayed in Chełm, the capital of the Ruthenian Kingdom. After the fall of Kiev and the further advance of Mongols, Michael and his son ran to Konrad, but later Michael tried to move to Silesia. On April 9, 1241 after he was robbed and his granddaughter was killed in Środa Śląska, Michael returned to Konrad in Mazovia.

Siege of Kiev

At the end of the fall, Batu's troops took Kiev. During that time Daniel stayed in Hungary conducting negotiations. Batu Khan moved towards Volodymyr. On his way Batu unsuccessfully tried to take the fortress of Kolodyazhyn (ru:Колодяжин), near the Sluch River. However, after some negotiations, the city residents were tricked into surrendering and then were slain. Batu Khan continued to Kamianets upon Sluch (today Myropil) and Izyaslav, taking both of the cities. After that Batu sacked many other cities including the capital cities Volodymyr and Halych. The only cities which survived were Kremenets, Chełm, and Danyliv.

References

External links
 Map of Batu 1240 expedition
 Hypatian Codex

Conflicts in 1240
Ruthenia
13th century in Ukraine
1240 in Europe
Military history of Kyiv
Ruthenia
Mongol invasion of Kievan Rus'